Sorghastrum is a genus of grasses, native to Africa and the Americas.

Members of the genus are commonly known as Indiangrass.<ref name="ITIS">{{ITIS |id=42099 |taxon=Sorghastrum |accessdate=2010-11-06}}</ref>

 Selected
 Sorghastrum balansae (Hack.) Dávila - Paraguay
 Sorghastrum brunneum Swallen - Mexico, Guatemala, Honduras
 Sorghastrum chaseae Swallen - Mato Grosso, Paraíba
 Sorghastrum contractum (Hack.) M.Kuhlm. & Kuhn - Brazil
 Sorghastrum crassum Renvoize - Bolivia
 Sorghastrum elliottii (C.Mohr) Nash – Slender Indiangrass - southeastern + south-central USA (Texas to Virginia)
 Sorghastrum fuscescens (Pilg.) Clayton - Tanzania, Zambia, Malawi
 Sorghastrum incompletum (J.Presl) Nash - Latin America from Mexico to Bolivia; Africa from Senegal to Zimbabwe
 Sorghastrum minarum (Nees) Hitchc. - Bolivia, Brazil, Paraguay, Argentina
 Sorghastrum nudipes Nash - Chihuahua, Durango, Sonora, Limpopo, Botswana, Namibia, Zimbabwe, Zambia, Mozambique, Malawi, Angola
 Sorghastrum nutans (L.) Nash – Yellow Indiangrass - Canada, USA, Mexico, Honduras
 Sorghastrum pellitum (Hack.) Parodi - Paraguay, Brazil, Argentina, Uruguay
 Sorghastrum pogonostachyum (Stapf) Clayton - Tanzania, Angola, Zambia, Malawi
 Sorghastrum pohlianum Dávila, L.I.Cabrera & R.Lira - Socorro Island in Colima
 Sorghastrum scaberrimum (Nees) Herter - Brazil
 Sorghastrum secundum (Elliott) Nash – Lopsided Indiangrass - southeastern USA; Bahamas
 Sorghastrum setosum (Griseb.) Hitchc. – Sandysoil Indiangrass - Latin America + West Indies from Veracruz to Uruguay
 Sorghastrum stipoides (Kunth) Nash – Needle Indiangrass - tropical + southern Africa; naturalized in Latin America
 Sorghastrum tisserantii Clayton - Central African Rep
 Sorghastrum viride'' Swallen - Paraguay, Brazil, Argentina, Uruguay

References

External links

 Grassbase - The World Online Grass Flora

Andropogoneae
Poaceae genera